"The Golden Shandy" is a 1959 episode of the TV series Goodyear Theatre.

It marked the last filmed performance of Errol Flynn and was broadcast after he died.

Plot
Traveling medicine man Doc Boatwright goes through Nugget City. The female co-owner of a saloon throws a brick of the saloon at him. Boatwright realises the brick contains gold and tries to con her out of it.

Cast
Errol Flynn as Doc Boatwright
Patricia Barry as Adie Walker
Peter Hansen as Mike Walker
James McCallion as Hermise Schneider
Fred Sherman as Clyde Murrow
Juney Ellis as Henrietta

Production
The script was based on a short story by Australian writer Edward Dyson which was first published in 1889. Dyson later turned it into a play.

In August 1959 Hedda Hopper reported that Patricia Barry turned down the chance to appear in Line Up to go to New York to make the production. "She must have wanted a trip to New York," wrote Hopper.

The production was shot in three days. Director Arthur Hiller said Flynn had a great deal of trouble remembering his lines.

References

External links
Complete text of The Golden Shanty by Edward Dyson
The Golden Shanty at IMDb

1959 in American television
1959 television episodes